Magnolia Fields or Magnolia Park is a 9.7 hectare Local Nature Reserve in Hawkwell in Essex. It is owned by Rochford District Council and managed by Hawkwell Parish Council.

The site is a former brickworks and evidence of its former activity is still visible, including a pond. There is a wide variety of birds, including bullfinches.

There is access from Magnolia Road.

References

Local Nature Reserves in Essex